Arthur (Metz Field) Aerodrome  was located  east southeast of Arthur, Ontario, Canada.

See also
List of airports in the Arthur area

References

Defunct airports in Ontario